Phoberus fascicularis is a species of hide beetle in the subfamily Troginae.

References

fascicularis
Beetles described in 1821